Introducing, Selma Blair is a 2021 American documentary film, directed by Rachel Fleit. It follows Selma Blair, adapting to new ways of living after revealing her multiple sclerosis diagnosis.

The film had its world premiere at South by Southwest on March 16, 2021, where it won the Special Jury Award for Exceptional Intimacy in Storytelling in the Documentary Feature Competition. It was released in a limited release on October 15, 2021, prior to streaming on Discovery+ on October 21, 2021.

Synopsis
Selma Blair adapts to new ways of living after revealing her multiple sclerosis diagnosis.

Release
The film had its world premiere at South by Southwest on March 16, 2021. Prior to, Discovery+ acquired distribution rights to the film. It was released in a limited release on October 15, 2021, prior to digital streaming on Discovery+ on October 21, 2021.

Reception
The film received overwhelmingly positive reviews from critics. It holds a 100% approval rating on Rotten Tomatoes, based on 32 reviews, with an average rating of 8.1/10. The website's critics consensus reads: "Introducing, Selma Blair lives up to its title with a personal look at a celebrity pulling back the curtain with courage, humor, and grace." On Metacritic, the film has a weighted average score of 80 out of 100 based on 12 critics, indicating "generally favorable reviews".

Accolades 
Introducing, Selma Blair won The Cinema for Peace Award on Global Health for 2021.

References

External links
 

2021 films
2021 documentary films
American documentary films
Documentary films about actors
Films about multiple sclerosis
LD Entertainment films
2020s English-language films
2020s American films